Arthromeris mairei is a fern species in the genus Arthromeris.

Two afzelechin glycosides, arthromerin A (afzelechin-3-O-β-D-xylopyranoside) and arthromerin B (afzelechin-3-O-β-D-glucopyranoside), can be isolated from the roots of A. mairei.

References

External links 

Polypodiaceae